Pennsylvania Railroad 1737 is a 4-6-2 Pacific type K4 class steam locomotive built in 1914 as the first of its class and would haul heavier passenger trains that the smaller E class 4-4-2 Alantics could not handle such as the PRR's flagship passenger train, the Broadway Limited. In the 1930s, as the PRR had increased passenger service time tables, the trains became longer and heavier than a single K4s could handle, necessitating double-heading with a second engine. The "Standard Railroad Of The World" made attempts to replace the 1737 and its sisters with larger, more powerful classes including: K5, S1, and the T1, none of which were successful;  thus, the K4s continued hauling passenger trains until the Pennsylvania Railroad replaced steam locomotives with the increasingly-popular and less-costly diesel-electric locomotives in 1957.

Commuter service
The 1737 was no stranger to commuter service. The New York and Long Branch Railroad in South Amboy, New Jersey used the K4s to haul commuter trains. When the famous electric Pennsylvania Railroad class GG1 would bring the trains from New York City's Penn Station, the K4s would take over the train and make the run from the South Amboy station to Bay Head, New Jersey.

Fate
The 1737 was originally slated to be preserved as part of the PRR's Historical Collection at a roundhouse in Northumberland, Pennsylvania. However, by the late 1950s, 1737 had deteriorated to the point where the PRR deemed the locomotive in very poor condition to be preserved. Instead, the PRR quietly took another K-4, No. 3750, and renumbered it to represent No. 1737 while the real No. 1737 was broken up for scrap in 1960.

See also
Pennsylvania Railroad 1361

References

Sources 

1737
4-6-2 locomotives
Railway locomotives introduced in 1914
Individual locomotives of the United States
Scrapped locomotives
Standard gauge locomotives of the United States